The Bedell Bridge was a Burr truss covered bridge that spanned the Connecticut River between Newbury, Vermont and Haverhill, New Hampshire. The bridge was divided into two spans of roughly equal length, and rested on a central pier and shore abutments constructed from mortared rough stone. The eastern abutment has been shored up by the addition of a concrete footing. Because the state line is the western low-water mark of the Connecticut River, most of the bridge was in New Hampshire; only the western abutment is in Vermont.

The site is now part of the  Bedell Bridge State Park in Haverhill, New Hampshire.

History 
There have been five bridges on this site. The first was built in 1805 and heavily damaged in 1823. Quickly rebuilt that year, it was washed away in 1841. A third bridge was carried away by a spring flood in 1862. The fourth bridge was destroyed in a storm on July 4, 1866, and replaced the same year. This fifth bridge was in service for 92 years, until it was closed to traffic in 1958. It was scheduled for demolition in 1973 due to heavy damage that year.

A "Save the Bedell Bridge Committee" raised $250,000 to rebuild the bridge, which was completed by 1978, and included the establishment of the associated Bedell Bridge State Park in the area of the eastern abutment. The bridge was rededicated on July 22, 1979, only to be blown away again by a windstorm on September 14, 1979. The state park, as well as the abutments and a pier in the river, are all that remain.

When first built, the bridge was in private ownership, and a toll was charged to cross it. In 1916, the towns of Newbury and Haverhill purchased the bridge and eliminated the toll. Ownership of the bridge was transferred to the state of New Hampshire in 1967.

Image gallery

See also 

 List of crossings of the Connecticut River
 List of New Hampshire covered bridges
 List of Vermont covered bridges
 National Register of Historic Places listings in Grafton County, New Hampshire
 National Register of Historic Places listings in Orange County, Vermont
 List of bridges on the National Register of Historic Places in New Hampshire
 List of bridges on the National Register of Historic Places in Vermont

Notes

References

External links 

 Bedell Bridge State Park official site
 Haverhill, New Hampshire Bedell Bridge site
 Wildernet site

Bridges over the Connecticut River
Buildings and structures in Newbury, Vermont
Bridge disasters in the United States
Covered bridges on the National Register of Historic Places in New Hampshire
Covered bridges on the National Register of Historic Places in Vermont
Wooden bridges in New Hampshire
Wooden bridges in Vermont
Bridges in Grafton County, New Hampshire
Tourist attractions in Grafton County, New Hampshire
Covered bridges in Orange County, Vermont
Bridge disasters caused by wind
Former toll bridges in New Hampshire
Former toll bridges in Vermont
1805 establishments in New Hampshire
National Register of Historic Places in Grafton County, New Hampshire
Haverhill, New Hampshire
Road bridges on the National Register of Historic Places in New Hampshire
Road bridges on the National Register of Historic Places in Vermont
Burr Truss bridges in the United States
1805 establishments in Vermont
Interstate vehicle bridges in the United States